Bradina is a genus of moths of the family Crambidae.

Species
Bradina aaronalis Schaus, 1924
Bradina adhaesalis (Walker, 1859)
Bradina admixtalis (Walker, 1859)
Bradina agraphalis (Guenée, 1854)
Bradina albigenitalis Hampson, 1917
Bradina angusta (Butler, 1882)
Bradina angustalis Yamanaka, 1984
Bradina antenoralis (Walker, 1859)
Bradina argentata (Butler, 1887)
Bradina atralis (Pagenstecher, 1907)
Bradina atopalis (Walker, 1858)
Bradina aulacodialis Strand, 1919
Bradina aurata (Butler, 1887)
Bradina aureolalis de Joannis, 1899
Bradina bicoloralis Hampson, 1896
Bradina carterotoxa Meyrick, 1932
Bradina cauvinalis Legrand, 1966
Bradina ceramica Rothschild, 1915
Bradina chalcophaea Meyrick, 1932
Bradina chalinota (Meyrick, 1886)
Bradina chlorionalis Tams, 1935
Bradina chloroscia (Meyrick, 1886)
Bradina cirrhophanes Meyrick, 1932
Bradina costalis Hampson, 1907
Bradina dentalis Hampson, 1907
Bradina desumptalis (Walker, 1866)
Bradina diagonalis (Guenée, 1854)
Bradina emphasis J. F. G. Clarke, 1986
Bradina eremica J. F. G. Clarke, 1986
Bradina erilitalis (C. Felder, R. Felder & Rogenhofer, 1875)
Bradina erilitoides Strand, 1919
Bradina eucentra (Meyrick, 1937)
Bradina extenuatalis (Walker, 1865)
Bradina fidelia J. F. G. Clarke, 1986
Bradina finbaralis Schaus, 1924
Bradina flavalis (Hampson, 1917)
Bradina geminalis Caradja, 1927
Bradina glaucinalis Hampson, 1907
Bradina haplomorpha Meyrick, 1932
Bradina hemmingalis
Bradina impressalis Lederer, 1863
Bradina intermedialis Caradja, 1932
Bradina itysalis Viette, 1957
Bradina leopoldi Ghesquière, 1942
Bradina leptolopha Tams, 1935
Bradina leucura Hampson, 1897
Bradina liodesalis (Walker, 1859)
Bradina macaralis (Walker, 1859)
Bradina mannusalis (Walker, 1859)
Bradina megesalis (Walker, 1859)
Bradina melanoperas Hampson, 1896
Bradina metaleucalis Walker, 1865
Bradina miantodes Meyrick, 1932
Bradina modestalis (Lederer, 1863)
Bradina neuralis Hampson, 1907
Bradina nigripunctalis South in Leech & South, 1901
Bradina opacusalis Swinhoe, 1904
Bradina paeonialis (Druce, 1902)
Bradina parallela (Meyrick, 1886)
Bradina parbattoides Tams, 1935
Bradina perlucidalis Hampson, 1897
Bradina pionealis Snellen, 1890
Bradina plagalis (Moore, 1867)
Bradina planalis (Swinhoe, 1894)
Bradina postbicoloralis Rothschild, 1915
Bradina pumilialis Hampson, 1907
Bradina punctilinealis Hampson, 1907
Bradina purpurascens Hampson, 1907
Bradina pycnolopha Tams, 1935
Bradina rectilinealis South in Leech & South, 1901
Bradina remipes Hampson, 1897
Bradina selectalis Lederer, 1863
Bradina semnopa (Meyrick, 1886)
Bradina sordidalis (Dewitz, 1881)
Bradina stigmophanes Meyrick, 1932
Bradina stricta J. F. G. Clarke, 1986
Bradina subpurpurescens (Warren, 1896)
Bradina tormentifera Meyrick, 1929
Bradina translinealis Hampson, 1896
Bradina trigonalis Yamanaka, 1984
Bradina trispila (Meyrick, 1886)
Bradina xanthalis Hampson, 1917

References

 
Spilomelinae
Crambidae genera
Taxa named by Julius Lederer